Conus multiliratus is an extinct species of sea snail, a marine gastropod mollusk in the family Conidae, the cone snails, cone shells or cones.

Description
The size of the shell varies between 16.7 mm and 20.2 mm.

Distribution
This marine species of cone snail is found as a fossil from the Middle Miocene and Tertiary in Mexico, Panama and Colombia; in the Neogene of the Dominican Republic.

References

 Böse, E., 1906. Sobre algunas faunas terciarias de México. Boletin Instituto Geológico de México, 22: 1 -92
 Hendricks J.R. (2015). Glowing seashells: diversity of fossilized coloration patterns on coral reef-associated cone snail (Gastropoda: Conidae) shells from the Neogene of the Dominican Republic. PLoS ONE. 10(4): e0120924

External links
 To World Register of Marine Species

multiliratus